9LV is a Naval Combat Management System (CMS) from the Swedish company Saab. The 9LV was established when Philips Teleindustri AB (1975 renamed Philips Elektronikindustrier AB), a subsidiary of Philips of the Netherlands, was selected as the supplier of the torpedo and dual purpose gun fire control system including a radar fire control director for the Royal Swedish Navy Norrköping-class torpedo boats.

However, not until the air defence fire control and radar fire control director was introduced, the name 9LV was established; LV is the Swedish abbreviation for "luftvärn", i.e. air defence. 

9LV is currently used on several classes of naval combatants, including the Australian s, the Swedish s, the Canadian s and the Australian  ships. It will be used on the Norwegian Coast Guard’s new Jan Mayen-class vessels.

Name etymology 
The heritage of the name 9LV can be traced back to the late 1960s and Philips Teleindustri (Järfälla, SE).  Philips gave the number nine to the product from Sweden.

LV is the Swedish abbreviation for Ground Based Air Defence (GBAD), in Swedish "Luftvärn".

Often, a specific ship class 9LV configuration is identified by a three digit number, consisting of one complexity digit and a two digit serial or country code. The first digit is defined by the following table.

Naval Combat Management introduction 
A Naval Combat Management System (CMS) is the computer system that connects a naval ship's sensors, weapons, data links, support measures and other equipment to the officers and staff performing the tasks in combat through the cycle of the OODA loop. Typical functions include sensor control, sensor data fusion, threat evaluation, weapons assignment, weapons control etc.

9LV Mk1 (1968–1977) 
To meet the requirements of the Royal Swedish Navy weapon control system on the Norrköping-class, the 9LV200 system was developed from 1968 by Philips Swedish subsidiary ("Philips TeleindustriAB", PTAB).  The contract was awarded PTAB 1969.

The solution included was based on analogue computers with a newly developed hydraulically controlled director platform and a frequency agile Ku-band fire control radar, Ceros. The solution also included an X-band track-while-scan target acquisition radar. In the Royal Swedish Navy, the system was denoted "ARTE 722".

Mk1 included a fixed program digital computer.

9LV Mk2 (1977–1983) 
The patrol boat Jägaren ("The hunter") was built as a test vessel with the Norwegian gun boats Storm and Snögg as references.  Later Bergens Mekaniske Verksteder built another 16 patrol boats based on Jägaren. The patrol boats were equipped with 9LV Mk2 (Arte 726).  The system was called 9LV Mk2 during the period Arte726 A-D.
After the Patrol Boats had been decommissioned these radars where modernised and fitted to the modernised Koster-class minehunters.

9LV Mk2.5 (1983–1987) 
The 9LV Mk2.5 introduced a new high level language (RTL/2) and also upgrades to the hardware architecture with new processors and busses. The Swedish Navy Arte726E is an example of 9LV Mk2.5.

9LV Mk3 (1987–2005) 

Based on the experiences from 9LV Mk2.5, a major redesign of 9LV was performed for 9LV Mk3, starting around 1985. It featured a module based architecture called Base System 2000 (Bassystem 2000), as an addition of the commercial OS-9 real-time operating system. The new programming language Ada was introduced in cooperation with the company Rational.  After the acquisition of the Ericsson "H Division" developing a competing Combat Management System (Maril systems) January 1, 1990, several key architectural features were transferred into 9LV Mk3.

Features of 9LV Mk3 included a fully distributed system, based on Ethernet LAN, with small, location independent, applications implemented in Ada. It also featured a "system family" concept, with all ship classes based on a common code base (reference book on reuse) and multi-function consoles, allowing any operator to perform any task from any position.

9LV Mk3E (1998–2008) 
Aiming to benefit from the fast development of commercially available hardware, the software base of Mk3 was transferred to Intel based processors on cPCI, running MS Windows NT instead of the real-time OS-9 used in Mk3.

9LV Mk4 (2008–) 

In order to facilitate integration and partnerships, the Mk4 was developed towards the Naval Open Architecture. Mk4 employs DDS to create modularity and introduces the Java programming language for certain applications. The first deployment of some limited 9LV Mk4 software components were as part of the Lockheed Martin Canada CMS330 Combat System used on the Halifax-class frigate where Saab acted as a sub-supplier to Lockheed-Martin Canada. Later versions of CMS330 do not utilize 9LV Mk4 components.

One important milestone for 9LV Mk4 was the firing on 30 August 2015 of the ESSM missile 

from HTMS Naresuan during Exercise CARAT 2015, less than three years after the signing of the contract for the missile.

As Saab has evolved the architecture of 9LV with virtualization, containerization and other technologies, the generation indicator ("Mk4") is becoming less emphasized and is not even mentioned in marketing, instead the term NextGen is used.

Awards and recognition

Company heritage of 9LV development 
The history of C2S, the creator of 9LV
 1938: Standard Radiofabrik is established
 1956: SRT (Standard Radio & Telefon AB) is founded  
 1964: SRT builds a factory in Veddesta, Järfälla outside Stockholm
 1968: Philips Teleindustrier is established; opening ceremony with the Swedish King
 1971: Stansaab is created out of the computer part of SRT, (owners are the state, Saab and ITT)
 1973: ITT leaves their ownership of Stansaab
 1975: Stansaab get a big order regarding AOC in Moskva
 1976: Philips Elektronikindustrier (merger with Philips Teleindustrier)
 1978: Datasaab created from merger of Stansaab & Datasaab
 1981: Ericsson buys Datasaab and keeps Alfaskop while SRA procures radar systems, later to be Ericsson Radio Systems 
 1982: Ericsson Information Systems (EIS) established
 1982: SRA Communications AB is established
 1983: Marconi leaves ownership of SRA to Ericsson Radio Systems 
 1988: Command & control and radar technology becomes Ericsson Radar Electronics (ERE)
 1990: Bofors Electronics (BEAB) acquires Philips, Ericssons (ERE) military production
 1991: BEAB joins Nobeltech
 1993: Nobeltech changes name to Celsiustech
 2000: Saab buys Celsiustech; new names are SaabTech Systems and SaabTech Electronics
 2003: SaabTech created from Saab Avionics & SaabTech Systems
 2005: Saab Systems created
 2009: Saab Security and defence solutions

Command and control history within Saab
1966 a work group started (name SESAM) to work on the next generation combat management system. This led to the first drafts on what was later to become NIBS (Näckens InformationsBehandlingsSystem). The group came up with an entirely digital combined combat and fire control solution with two operator positions able to evaluate at least 10 targets. The three operator consoles where of Stansaab type. The order was later given to Stansaab; the software was delivered by Teleplan.  
 
 1988: SESUB (Strids- & Eldledning SUBmarin); contract awarded to Datasaab (modern NIBS)
 1996: SESUB 940 entire solution awarded to CelsiusTech

References

Bibliography
 .
 

Military computers
Saab